The Palisades are a mountain range in Napa County, California. The Palisades are located in Robert Louis Stevenson State Park on the other side of California State Route 29 as Mt. St. Helena. The Palisades trailhead is located on the valley floor of the Napa Valley near Calistoga and is a 6-mile one way hike.

References 

Mountain ranges of Napa County, California
Mountain ranges of the San Francisco Bay Area
Mountain ranges of Northern California